Mahogany refers to dark-colored wood from various types of tree.

Mahogany may also refer to:

Botany and forestry
 Three species in the genus Swietenia:
 Swietenia macrophylla
 Swietenia mahagoni
 Swietenia humilis
 Eastern Australian trees in the genus Karrabina
 African Mahogany:
 Afzelia, genus in the family Fabaceae
 Khaya, genus in the family Meliaceae
 Blue Mountains mahogany, Eucalyptus notabilis
 Chinese mahogany, Toona sinensis
 Dundas mahogany, Eucalyptus brockwayi
 Indian mahogany, Toona ciliata
 Indonesian mahogany, Toona sureni
 Mountain mahogany:
 species of trees in the genus Cercocarpus
 Eucalyptus notabilis
 Natal mahogany, Trichilia emetica
 Philippine mahogany:
 Shorea in the dipterocarp family Dipterocarpaceae
 Toona calantas and other species in the mahogany family Meliaceae
 Red mahogany:
 Eucalyptus pellita
 Eucalyptus resinifera
 Eucalyptus scias, large-fruited red mahogany
 Southern mahogany, Eucalyptus botryoides
 Swamp mahogany:
 Lophostemon suaveolens, native to Australia and New Guinea
 Eucalyptus robusta
 Swan River mahogany, Eucalyptus marginata, also called jarrah
 Thick-leafed mahogany, Eucalyptus carnea
 White mahogany:
 Eucalyptus acmenoides
 Eucalyptus apothalassica
 Eucalyptus psammitica
 Eucalyptus tenuipes, narrow-leaved white mahogany
 Eucalyptus umbra, broad-leaved white mahogany

Places
 Mahogany Mountains, a mountain range on the Nevada-Utah border
 Mahogany Mountain, an ancient volcano on the border between Oregon and Idaho
 Mahogany Hills, a mountain range in Nevada
 Mahogany, Calgary, a neighbourhood in Calgary, Alberta, Canada
 Mahogany Bluff, Graham Land, Antarctica

Arts & entertainment
 Mahogany (band), a band from Brooklyn, New York, USA
 Mahogany (film), starring Diana Ross
 Mahogany (soundtrack), to the film
 "Mahogany", a song by Lil Wayne from the album Funeral
 Mahagonny, the fictional city in the opera Rise and Fall of the City of Mahagonny

Other
 Mahogany (color), inspired by the wood
 Mahogany (drink), a blend of gin and treacle
 Mahogany (e-mail client), an OpenSource cross-platform e-mail and news client
 Mahogany (horse), Australian racehorse
 USS Mahogany (AN-23), a net-laying ship in World War II
 Mahogany Avenue, a road in Tagaytay, Cavite, Philippines
 Mahogany Research Project, initiative by Shell Oil to procure oil in Colorado, USA

See also
 Mahogany Ship, possibly mythical wrecked ship in south-western Victoria, Australia
 Honey Mahogany (born 1983), Ethiopian-American former drag queen and politician
 Kevin Mahogany (1958–2017), American jazz vocalist